Harry M. Steinfeldt (September 29, 1875 – August 17, 1914) was an American professional baseball player. A third baseman, Steinfeldt played in Major League Baseball for the Cincinnati Reds, Chicago Cubs, and Boston Rustlers. He batted and threw right-handed.

Steinfeldt was the starting third baseman for the Cubs in the final game of the 1908 World Series, the team's last championship until their victory in 2016. He was the fourth infielder on a team that gained fame for a double-play combination of "Tinker to Evers to Chance."

Early life
Steinfeldt was born in St. Louis, Missouri on September 29, 1875, to German immigrants. His family moved to Fort Worth, Texas when he was five years old. He initially pursued a theatrical career.

Career

While touring Texas in a minstrel show, Steinfeldt played baseball in a town where his show was performing. His success at baseball led him to sign his first professional contract, debuting in minor league baseball with the Houston Magnolias/Mudcats of the Class B Texas-Southern League in 1895. The next year, he played for the Galveston Sandcrabs and Fort Worth Panthers of the Class C Texas Association. In 1897, Steinfeldt played for the Detroit Tigers of the Class A Western League.

In October 1897, the Cincinnati Reds of the National League (NL) purchased Steinfeldt from Detroit. Debuting in the major leagues for the Reds in 1898, he filled in for Bid McPhee, Tommy Corcoran, and Charlie Irwin as a utility infielder. When the Reds released Irwin during the 1901 season, Steinfeldt became the Reds' starting third baseman. He led the NL in doubles in 1903 with 32.

On October 24, 1905, the Reds traded Steinfeldt, with Jimmy Sebring, to the Chicago Cubs for Jake Weimer. He led the NL in hits in 1906 with 176 and tied with Jim Nealon for most runs batted in (RBIs) with 83. His .327 batting average finished second, behind Honus Wagner (.339).

Steinfeldt set a major league record with three sacrifice flies in a game in 1909. Ernie Banks tied the record in 1961.

Steinfeldt is the only member of the Cubs' infield, which also included Joe Tinker, Johnny Evers, and Frank Chance, who was left out of Franklin Pierce Adams' famous poem "Baseball's Sad Lexicon" (the famous trio played together for ten years, starting in 1902, while Steinfeldt played with them for four years).

On April 5, 1911, the St. Paul Saints of the American Association purchased Steinfeldt from the Cubs. On May 25, 1911, St. Paul traded Steinfeldt to the Boston Rustlers for Art Butler and Josh Clarke. Steinfeldt fell ill in July 1911, leaving the team. It was later identified as a nervous breakdown. The Rustlers released Steinfeldt after the season.

In 1912, Steinfeldt returned to minor league baseball. He managed the Cincinnati Pippins of the United States Baseball League, but the league folded in midseason. He also played for the Louisville Colonels of the American Association, but was released in May. In June, he became the manager of the Meriden Metropolitans of the Cotton States League.

In 1647 games over 14 major league seasons, Steinfeldt posted a .267 batting average (1578-for-5900) with 759 runs, 284 doubles, 90 triples, 27 home runs, 762 RBI, 202 stolen bases, 471 bases on balls, .330 on-base percentage and .360 slugging percentage. He finished his career with an overall .927 fielding percentage. In 21 World Series games, he hit .260 (19-for-73) with 7 runs, 3 doubles, 1 triple, 8 RBI, 2 stolen bases and 4 walks.

Death
Steinfeldt died in Bellevue, Kentucky in 1914 after a long illness, at the age of 38. He is interred at Spring Grove Cemetery in Cincinnati. The death certificate indicates that he died of a cerebral hemorrhage.

See also

 List of Major League Baseball annual runs batted in leaders
 List of Major League Baseball annual doubles leaders

References

External links

Retrosheet

1875 births
1914 deaths
Major League Baseball third basemen
Cincinnati Reds players
Chicago Cubs players
Boston Rustlers players
National League RBI champions
19th-century baseball players
Minor league baseball managers
Houston Magnolias players
Houston Mudcats players
Fort Worth Panthers players
Galveston Sandcrabs players
Detroit Tigers (Western League) players
Louisville Colonels (minor league) players
Baseball players from St. Louis
Burials at Spring Grove Cemetery